FC Uholyok Myrnohrad, formerly FC Uholyok Dymytov was a professional football club based in Myrnohrad, Donetsk Oblast, Ukraine.

History 

The club was formed in 2001 as Vuhlyk Dymytrov and initially competed in the Donetsk Oblast competition including the Oblast Cup.

The team also participated in 2001 in the Ukrainian Football Amateur League.

The club was granted a professional license and debuted in the 2002–03 Ukrainian Second League competition. The team struggled for two seasons. Prior to the start of 2004–05 Ukrainian Second League season the club renamed themselves to Uholyok.

The club withdrew their licence from the PFL before the start of the 2005–06 season citing financial difficulties.

Uholyok continued to participate in the amateur competitions winning the Krasnoarmieyskiy Krayy Kubok in 2009 but the team disappear from the football map after 2010.

League and cup history 

{|class="wikitable"
|-bgcolor="#efefef"
! Season
! Div.
! Pos.
! Pl.
! W
! D
! L
! GS
! GA
! P
!Domestic Cup
!colspan=2|Europe
!Notes
|- 			
|align=center|2002–03
|align=center|3rd "C"
|align=center|14
|align=center|28
|align=center|5
|align=center|8
|align=center|15
|align=center|12
|align=center|37
|align=center|23
|align=center|1/32 finals
|align=center|
|align=center|
|align=center|as Vuhlyk Dymytrov
|- 			 	
|align=center|2003–04
|align=center|3rd "C"
|align=center|14
|align=center|30
|align=center|5
|align=center|4
|align=center|21
|align=center|18
|align=center|61
|align=center|19
|align=center|1/32 finals
|align=center|
|align=center|
|align=center|as Vuhlyk Dymytrov
|- 			
|align=center|2004–05
|align=center|3rd "C"
|align=center|8
|align=center|28
|align=center|8
|align=center|7
|align=center|13
|align=center|36
|align=center|47
|align=center|31
|align=center|1/32 finals
|align=center|
|align=center|
|align=center|as Uholyok Dymytrov
|}

References 

Uholyok Myrnohrad
Association football clubs established in 2001
Association football clubs disestablished in 2010
2001 establishments in Ukraine
2010 disestablishments in Ukraine
Myrnohrad